Samuel Griffith (February 14, 1816October 1, 1893) was a Welsh-American political figure who represented Pennsylvania's 20th congressional district in the U.S. House of Representatives from March 4, 1871 to March 3, 1873.

Biography
Griffith's birthplace in Wales, Merthyr Tydfil, was a booming industrial town which, at the time, was a part of the historic county of Glamorgan.  He was instructed in elementary subjects by a private teacher and subsequently graduated from Allegheny College in Meadville, Pennsylvania.  Following law studies, he was admitted to the bar in 1846, at the age of thirty and, over the following decades, practiced law in the Mercer County seat, Mercer.

At the age of fifty-six, he campaigned as a Democrat to represent his congressional district and was elected to the 42nd United States Congress in November 1870.  After an unsuccessful reelection campaign in 1872, he resumed law practice in Mercer.

Samuel Griffith died in Mercer at the age of seventy-seven and was buried in Mercer Cemetery.

References

The Political Graveyard

Pennsylvania lawyers
Welsh emigrants to the United States
People from Merthyr Tydfil
People from Mercer County, Pennsylvania
1816 births
1893 deaths
Democratic Party members of the United States House of Representatives from Pennsylvania
19th-century American politicians
19th-century American lawyers